Kindaichi is a surname and place name in Japan.

Real people with the surname
Kyōsuke Kindaichi (1882–1971): Linguist specializing in the Ainu language 
Haruhiko Kindaichi (1913–2004): Linguist and professor emeritus at Tokyo University of Foreign Studies
Hideho Kindaichi (b. 1953): Linguist and critic, professor at Kyorin University

Fictitious uses of the surname
Kosuke Kindaichi in Seishi Yokomizo's Novel Series
Hajime Kindaichi in The Kindaichi Case Files and the grandson of Kosuke Kindaichi
Yutaro Kindaichi in Haikyuu

Place with this name
The city of Ninohe in Iwate Prefecture has a locality named Kindaichi ( or Kintaichi ).
Kindaichi Onsen - onsen in Iwate Prefecture.

See also 
Special:Prefixindex/Kindaichi